Vojvođanska banka a.d. Novi Sad, commonly just Vojvođanska banka was a bank based in Novi Sad, Serbia. It was a universal bank, with functions of commercial and investment banking. In December 2017, it became a member of OTP Bank Group and merged with OTP banka Srbija, which later changed name to Vojvođanska banka.

History
The first branch of Vojvodjanska banka was founded in 1868 in Sombor as a credit cooperative. Later, in 1962, Vojvodjanska banka was repackaged as Privredna banka; soon after, Privredna banka was joined by Komercijalna banka Senta, Komercijalna banka Bačka Topola, Sremska banka Sremska Mitrovica, Kreditna banka Kula and Banatska banka Zrenjanin. In 1973, Privredna banka became Vojvođanska banka, the largest banking institution in the province of Vojvodina and one of the largest in the country. It had 16 branches.

In the end of the 1970s, Bank opened three independent representative offices in New York City, London and Frankfurt; and joint representative offices established in Moscow, Beijing and Tehran.

In the 1980s, Vojvođanska Bank became a member of the Yugoslav Banking Consortium for the realization of the first loan granted by IFC for the development of small companies; and Associate Bank realized 70% of the total foreign exchange operations of Vojvodina economy. In 1989, the Bank split up into 9 equal successors; the Head Office and 8 branches.

Later, during the 1990s, Bank started to open more branches in Central Serbia, Banja Luka (in Republika Srpska) and in Podgorica (Montenegro). The branch office in Banja Luka became an independent bank with the major equity share in private ownership. Vojvodjanska banka was the co-founder and shareholder of VB Banja Luka.

On 30 May 1995, Vojvodjanska banka d.d. became Vojvodjanska banka a.d. (joint-stock company) and was registered within the Serbian Agency for Business Registers. The Government of Serbia owned a majority of shares.

2006–2017
In September 2006, National Bank of Greece bought 99.44% of Vojvođanska banka's capital for €385 million. In Serbian retail banking market, it is the first in Serbian Dinars savings, third in foreign currency savings and first according to the number of issued VISA cards – over 430,000.

2017–2019
In December 2017, OTP banka Srbija bought 100% of shares of Vojvođanska banka from the National Bank of Greece. In May 2019, the process of integration of OTP banka Srbija and Vojvođanska banka was finalized, and OTP Bank as majority owner decided to operate under name Vojvođanska banka on Serbian market, formally changing the "OTP banka Srbija" name.

Branches
As of 2017, the bank had a total of 104 branches in 80 cities across Serbia.

Logos
The first logo of Vojvođanska banka was designed in 1957. It contained the two upper-case Latin letters V and B like the geometric shape, where the letter V was shaped as parallelogram and the letter B was shaped as two halves of circle. This logo of the Bank was in use until 1973. From 1973, the Vojvođanska banka logo contained the two lower-case Latin letters v and b, where the letter v was smaller than the letter b and the first letter was placed above the second letter. This logo of the Bank was in use until 1992, when it was replaced logo similar to the American dollar sign which contains the two upper-case Cyrillic letters В and Б, where the letter В is reversed and touches the letter Б.

See also
 List of banks in Serbia

References

External links

2019 mergers and acquisitions
Banks established in 1868
Banks disestablished in 2019
Banks of Serbia
Companies based in Novi Sad
Serbian brands